The South Surrey Park and Ride is a bus loop and park and ride facility serving the South Surrey area. As part of the TransLink system, it is used by five routes serving South Surrey and White Rock, including towards Vancouver via Bridgeport station in Richmond as well as to Newton and Surrey City Centre.

History
The first South Surrey Park and Ride opened on May 8, 1991, located at 152 Street and Cranley Drive (now mall access for Southpoint Exchange). On December 13, 1999, the park and ride was relocated so that the Southpoint Exchange mall could be constructed. The second site was located at 32 Avenue and 32 Avenue Diversion, a short distance from the original site. The third and current South Surrey park and ride facility was opened on June 26, 2006, adjacent to the Highway 99 and King George Boulevard interchange. 

In November 2013, an expansion of 367 parking spots was opened, and a $2-per-day parking fee was introduced. In December 2020, a COVID-19 test centre opened at the park and ride.

Routes
, the following routes serve the South Surrey Park and Ride:

See also
List of bus routes in Metro Vancouver

References

External links

TransLink (British Columbia) bus stations
White Rock, British Columbia
Transport in Surrey, British Columbia
1991 establishments in British Columbia